Desseria is a genus of parasitic alveolates belonging the phylum Apicomplexa. The genus was described in 1995. The species in this genus were previous considered to belong to the genus Haemogregarina.

The species in this genus infect fish. Approximately 40 species are recognised in this genus currently.

Host records

Desseria acanthoclini Laird 1953 - Acanthoclinus quadridactylus. 
Desseria acipenseri Nawrotsky 1914 - Acipenser ruthenis. 
Desseria aeglefini Henry 1913 - Gadus morhua, Melanogrammus aeglefinus, Pollachius virens, Urophysis species
Desseria anarhichadis Henry 1912 - Anarhichas lupus
Desseria bettencourti Franca 1908 - Anguilla species 
Desseria bothi Lebailly 1905 - Bothus rhombus
Desseria brevoortiae Saunders 1964 - Brevoortia tyrannus 
Desseria carpionis Franchini & Siani, 1923 - Cyprinus carpio 
Desseria catostomi Becker 1962 - Catostomus species
Desseria colisa Mandal et al 1983 - Colisa fasciatus 
Desseria cotti Brumpt & Lebailly 1904 - Cottus species 
Desseria cyprini Smirnova 1971 - Cyprinus carpio
Desseria dakarensis Leger & Leger, 1920 - Diagramma mediterraneum 
Desseria dasyatis Saunders 1958 - Dasyatis americanus
Desseria esocis Nawrotsky 1914 - Esox species
Desseria flesi Lebailly 1904 - Flesus vulgaris 
Desseria fragilis Fantham 1930 - Blennius cornutus 
Desseria gilbertia Mackerras & Mackerras 1925 - Ellerkeldia species 
Desseria gobionis Franchini & Siani 1923 - Gobio fluviatilis
Desseria heterodonti von Prowazek 1910 - Heterodontus japonicus 
Desseria irkalukpiki Laird 1961 - Salvelinus species
Desseria laternae Lebailly 1904 - Platophrys laternae 
Desseria lepidosirensis Jepps 1927 - Lepidosiren paradoxa 
Desseria leptocotti Hill & Hendrickson 1991 - Leptocottus armatus, Sebastes melanops 
Desseria londoni Yakimov & Kohl-Yakimov 1912 - Blennius trigloides 
Desseria mavori Laird & Bullock 1969 - Macrozoarces americanus
Desseria moringa Pessoa & de Biasi 1975 - Gymnothorax moringa
Desseria mugili Carini 1932 - Mugil species, Awaous ocellaris, Stenogobius genivittatus
Desseria myoxocephali Fantham et al 1942 - Euhirudinea, Malmiana scorpii, Myoxocephalus species
Desseria nili Wenyon 1909 - Ophriocephalus obscurus
Desseria ninakohlyakimovae Yakimov 1916 - Barbus species 
Desseria nototheniiae Barber et al 1987 - Notothenia species 
Desseria parasiluri Bykhovskaya-Pavlovskaya et al 1962 - Parasilurus asotus
Desseria platessae Lebailly, 1904 - Trinectes maculatus, Glyptocephalus cynoglossus, Paralichthys dentatus, Pleuronectes platessa, Pseudopleuronectes americanus, Scopthalmus aquosus
Desseria rovignensis Minchin & Woodcock 1910 - Trigla lineata. 
Desseria rubrimarensis Saunders, 1960 - Acanthurus species, Chlorus species, Scarus species 
Desseria salvelini Fantham et al 1942 - Salvelinus fontinalis
Desseria thyrosoideae de Mello & Valles 1936 - Thyrosoidea macrurus
Desseria tilapiae LŽger & LŽger 1914 - Tilapia lata
Desseria torpedinis Neumann 1909 - Torpedo species 
Desseria turkestanica Yakimov & Shorkhor 1917 - Silurus species

Synonyms

Desseria acipenseri - Leucocytogregarina species Perekropov 1928
Desseria aeglefini - Haemogregarina urophysis Fantham, Porter & Richardson 1942
Desseria anarhichadis - Haemogregarina anarrhichabis Henry 1912
Desseria cotti - Haemogregarina cotti Bauer 1948; H. baueri Becker 1968
Desseria lepidosirensis - Haemogregarina bertoni Shouten 1941
Desseria leptocotti - Haemogregarina reolofsi Hill & Hendrickson 1991
Desseria ninakohlyakimovae - Haemogregarina ninakohlyakimovae  Yakimov 1916, Wenyon 1926 emend. Levine 1985; Leucocytogregarina ninae kohl-yakimovae Yakimov 1916; L. ninae kohl-yakimovi Yakimov 1917; Leucocytozoon ninae kohl-yakimovae Yakimov 1917; Hepatozoon ninae kohl-yakimoff Yakimov 1916, Bykhovskaya-Pavlovskaya et al 1962
Desseria platessae - Haemogregarina achiri Saunders 1955
Desseria torpedinis - Haemogregarina lobianci Kohl-Yakimov & Yakimov 1912

References

Apicomplexa genera